Eos Glacier is a south-flowing glacier,  long, between Mount Peleus and Mount Theseus in the eastern part of the Olympus Range, in the McMurdo Dry Valleys of Antarctica. In association with names from Greek mythology grouped in this area, it was named by the New Zealand Geographic Board in 1998 after Eos, the mythological goddess of the dawn.
.

References 

Glaciers of Scott Coast